The serpentine dance is a form of dance that was popular throughout the United States and Europe in the 1890s, becoming a staple of stage shows and early film.

Background
The Serpentine is an evolution of the skirt dance, a form of burlesque dance that had recently arrived in the United States from England.  Skirt dancing was itself a reaction against "academic" forms of ballet, incorporating tamed-down versions of folk and popular dances like the can-can.

The new dance was originated by Loïe Fuller, who gave varying accounts of how she developed it.  By her own account, which is widely reported, having never danced professionally before, she accidentally discovered the effects of stage light cast from different angles on the gauze fabric of a costume she had hastily assembled for her performance in the play Quack M.D., and spontaneously developed the new form in response to the audience's enthusiastic reaction upon seeing the way her skirt appeared in the lights.  During the dance she held her long skirt in her hands, and waved it around, revealing her form inside. In the words of the dance historian Jack Anderson, "The costume for her Serpentine Dance consisted of hundreds of yards of China silk which she let billow around her while lighting effects suggested that it was catching fire and taking shapes reminiscent of flowers, clouds, birds, and butterflies."

Filmed versions
The Serpentine Dance was a frequent subject of early motion pictures, as it highlighted the new medium's ability to portray movement and light.  Two particularly well-known versions were Annabelle Serpentine Dance (1894), a performance by Broadway dancer Annabelle Whitford from Edison Studios, and a Lumière brothers film made in 1896.  Many other filmmakers produced their own versions, distributing prints that had been hand-tinted to evoke (though not quite reproduce) the appearance of colored light projection.

See also
 Serpentinen Tanz

References

External links
 Annabelle Serpentine Dance, No. 2 on YouTube
 Butterfly dance & Serpentine Dance (Annabelle Moore)

Vaudeville
Auguste and Louis Lumière
History of film
Articles containing video clips
Burlesque
Dance in the United States